Yangiskain (Yañğıźqayın) is a rural locality (a selo) and the administrative centre of Yangiskainsky Selsoviet, Gafuriysky District, Bashkortostan, Russia. The population was 888 as of 2010. There are 24 streets.

Geography 
Yangiskain is located 27 km southwest of Krasnousolsky (the district's administrative centre) by road. Ural is the nearest rural locality.

References 

Rural localities in Gafuriysky District
Ufa Governorate